NA-191 Kashmore is a newly-created constituency for the National Assembly of Pakistan. It comprises the entirety of Kashmore District. It was created in the 2018 delimitation from the merger of the old constituencies of NA-209 and NA-210.

Members of Parliament

2018-2022: NA-197 Kashmore

Election 2018 

General elections were held on 25 July 2018.

See also
NA-190 Jacobabad
NA-192 Shikarpur-I

References 

Kashmore